Gwyneth Cravens is an American novelist and journalist. She has published five novels. Her fiction and nonfiction have appeared in The New Yorker, where she also worked as a fiction editor, and in Harper's Magazine, where she was an associate editor. She has contributed articles and editorials on science and other topics to Harper's Magazine, The New York Times, and The Washington Post.

At a September 2007 seminar given by the Long Now Foundation, Cravens outlined the message of her book, Power to Save the World: The Truth About Nuclear Energy. Released in October 2007, it argued for nuclear power as a safe energy source and an essential preventive of global warming. She appeared in the documentary Pandora's Promise to speak about the merits of nuclear power.

Since then, she has given presentations to members of the technical and academic communities around the U.S., including the Brookings Institution, the Progressive Policy Institute, the University of Hartford, and Sandia National Laboratories. She has often shared the podium with Dr. D. Richard ("Rip") Anderson, a chemist, oceanographer, and international expert in nuclear risk assessment. These talks emphasize the need for the environmental and technical communities to work together to reduce the anthropogenic causes of catastrophic climate change.

Cravens has contributed articles on nuclear power as a low-carbon alternative energy source to The Huffington Post and Discover. In 2002, she wrote "Terrorism and Nuclear Energy: Understanding the Risks" for The Brookings Review.

Gwyneth Cravens has a daughter, the artist Astrid Cravens (born 1967). In 1974, she started dating the author Henry Beard. While there is some question if they ever married or not, they have continued as a couple. In May 2022, it was reported that Cravens, suffering from Alzheimer's disease, went missing for a brief period, but was later located.

Bibliography 
 The Black Death (1977), cinematised in 1992 as Quiet Killer.
 Speed of Light (1980)
 Love and Work (1982)
 Heart's Desire (1986)
 Gates of Paradise (1990)
 Power to Save the World: The Truth about Nuclear Energy (2007)

Filmography 
 Pandora's Promise (2013)

References

External links 

 Power To Save the World 
 Power To Save the World Conversation with Rip Anderson Video

20th-century American novelists
Living people
American women journalists
People associated with nuclear power
American women novelists
20th-century American women writers
20th-century American non-fiction writers
Year of birth missing (living people)
21st-century American women